46 Leonis Minoris (abbreviated 46 LMi), also named Praecipua , is the brightest star in the constellation of Leo Minor. It is of spectral class K0+III-IV and of magnitude 3.83. It is a red clump giant. Based upon parallax measurements, its distance from the Sun is approximately 95 light-years. It is a suspected variable with an amplitude of about 0.05 magnitudes.

Nomenclature 

46 Leonis Minoris is the star's Flamsteed designation. It is sometimes designated "o LMi" (not "ο LMi"), from Bode's catalogue of 1801. It was presumably intended to be designated α, as Francis Baily decided to letter each star brighter than magnitude 4.5, but the designation was missing from his catalogue, even though the dimmer β was included.

It bore the traditional proper name Praecipua, derived from the Latin for "the Chief (Star of Leo Minor)". The name may originally have referred to 37 Leonis Minoris, and later mistakenly transferred to this star. In 2016, the International Astronomical Union (IAU) organized a Working Group on Star Names (WGSN) to catalog and standardize proper names for stars. The WGSN approved the name Praecipua for this star on 30 June 2017 and it is now so included in the List of IAU-approved Star Names.

It is known as 勢四, "the Fourth (Star) of the Eunuch", in traditional Chinese astronomy.

See also 
 Chinese star names

References 

K-type giants
K-type subgiants
Suspected variables
Horizontal-branch stars
Leo Minor
Praecipua
BD+34 2172
Leonis Minoris, 46
094264
053229
4247